Reign Edwards (born December 1, 1996) is an American actress. She is best known for her role as Nicole Avant on the CBS soap opera The Bold and the Beautiful, for which she was nominated for the Daytime Emmy Award for Outstanding Younger Actress in a Drama Series in 2016, 2017 and 2018.

Career
In 2015, she was cast in the CBS drama series The Bold and the Beautiful in the role of  Nicole Avant.
In 2017, she took the recurring role of a secret agent in the series MacGyver. In 2018, she appeared in the horror film Hell Fest.

Filmography

Film

Television

Awards and nominations

References

External links 
 

1996 births
African-American actresses
American soap opera actresses
Living people
People from Maryland
21st-century African-American people
21st-century African-American women